{{Automatic taxobox
| taxon = Sorgenfreispira
| image = Bela brachystoma 001.jpg
| image_caption = Shell of Sorgenfreispira brachystoma
| authority = Moroni, 1979
| synonyms_ref = 
| synonyms =
| type_species = Cythara (Mangelia) moronii Venzo & Pelosio, 1964
| subdivision_ranks = Species
| subdivision = See text
| display_parents = 3
}}Sorgenfreispira is a genus of sea snails, marine gastropod mollusks in the family Mangeliidae.

Species
Species within the genus Sorgenfreispira include:
 Sorgenfreispira africana (Ardovini, 2004)
 Sorgenfreispira ardovinii (Mariottini & Oliverio, 2008)
 Sorgenfreispira brachystoma (Philippi, 1844)
 † Sorgenfreispira calais (Kautsky, 1925) 
 Sorgenfreispira exilis (Ardovini, 2004)
 † Sorgenfreispira moronii (Venzo & Pelosio, 1964)
 † Sorgenfreispira nitida (Pavia, 1975) 
 † Sorgenfreispira plicatelloides (Nordsieck, 1972) 
 † Sorgenfreispira pseudoexilis (Della Bella, Naldi & Scarponi, 2015) 
 † Sorgenfreispira scalariformis (Brugnone, 1862)
 † Sorgenfreispira sorgenfreii (Nordsieck, 1972) 
 † Sorgenfreispira tenella (Mayer, 1859) 

References

 Ardovini R., 2004. Due nuove specie e una nuova sottospecie di Turridae dal Senegal, West Africa. Malacologia,43: 7–9.
 Moroni, M.A. (1979) Sorgenfreispira, nuovo genere di Turridae (Gastropoda, Prosobranchia) del Miocene europeo.'' Lavori Dell’Istituto di Geologia della Università di Palermo, 16, 1–11.

External links
 Bouchet, P.; Kantor, Y. I.; Sysoev, A.; Puillandre, N. (2011). A new operational classification of the Conoidea. Journal of Molluscan Studies. 77, 273-308
 Worldwide Mollusk Data base : Mangeliidae
 Mariottini P., Di Giulio A., Smriglio C. & Oliverio M. (2015). Additional notes on the systematics and new records of East Atlantic species of the genus Sorgenfreispira Moroni, 1979 (Gastropoda Mangeliidae). Biodiversity Journal. 6(1): 431-440